The Drifting Avenger is a Japanese Western film shot in Australia. It was also known as Koya no toseinin.

Cast 

Ken Takakura as Ken Kato
	
Ken Goodlet as Marvin
	
Judith Roberts as Rosa
	
Kevin Cooney as Mike the boy
	
Ronald Norman Lea as Franco (as R. Lea)
	
Clive Saxon as Billy
	
Pat Twohill as Carson (as John Sherwood)
	
Reginald Collins as the Doctor
	
Ray Lamont as the Sheriff
	
Mike Danning as Laker (as Mike Dunning)
	
Osman Yusuf as Duncan (as John Yusef)
	
Stanley Rogers as Rogers (as Stan Rogers)
	
Tony Allen as Jack (as Tony Allan)
	
Chuck Kehoe as Ricky
	
Terry Farnsworth as Cowboy Gunslinger (as T. Fansworth)
	
Reg Gorman as Otto
	
Carlo Manchini as Wayne
	
Hans Horneff as Manager (as Hans Horner)
	
Graham Keating as Wess
	
Peter Armstrong as a Cowboy
	
Dew Purington (as D. Purington)
	
John Hopkins as Cowboy A (as J. Hopkins)
	
Liam Reynolds as Cowboy B (as L. Reynolds)
	
B. Evis as Cowboy C
	
Allen Bickford (as A. Bickford)
	
P. McCornill
	
Takashi Shimura as Ken's Father (as T. Shimura)

Production 
The film was shot at Goonoo Goonoo Station near Tamworth, with location scenes shot in the village of Nundle, & interior scenes shot at Toei Studios in Tokyo.

References

External links

The Drifting Avenger at Oz Movies

1968 films
1968 Western (genre) films
Japanese Western (genre) films
Films shot in Australia
Films directed by Junya Satō
1960s Japanese films